Cheryl D. Holmes Miller (born 1952) is an American graphic designer, Christian minister, writer, artist, theologian, and decolonizing historian. She is known for her contributions to racial and gender equality in the graphic design field, and establishing one of the first black-women-owned design firms in New York City in 1984. Her alma maters are the Maryland Institute College of Art, Pratt Institute, Rhode Island School of Design, and Union Theological.

Early life and education 
Miller is of African American and Philippine American ancestry and identifies as BIPOC. Her paternal family is from Washington, D.C. and her maternal family is Filipino Creole from the U.S. Virgin Islands. Miller's grandmother was an indigenous Danish west Indian and Ghanaian. Her great-great grandmother is of Ghanaian descent from St. Johns. Her Philippine grandfather was part of the U.S. Filipino navy as a steward's cook during WWI in 1917. Her grandparents met at the USO and married. Having three Filipino lineages of their own, Miller's mother being one of them. Her mother, a Filipino-Creole, came to the United States to attend Howard University. Her maternal Afro-Caribbean Saint-Tomian cousin Larry was installed as a chief of their tribe. Their tribe are artisans, specifically shipbuilders, wood carvers and make decorative coffins. Her paternal grandfather was white and American Indian with Patriotic daughters of American Revolution DNA.

Miller's parents met at Howard University in Washington, D.C. where they settled and began the family of their own. She was a Girl Scout and when she won her first award, she was published on the section covers of The Washington Post and Washington Star. As a child, Miller spent most of her days at museums looking at an era of contemporary art and the cadre of Washington color field schools. In 1969, her teacher told her that she will never make it as an artist, but her specific experiences and heritage became formative to her art practice.

Miller graduated from Calvin Coolidge High School. In 1985, she received a Masters of Science in Visual Communications at the Pratt Institute. As a thesis project, she was asked to make a contribution to the field of graphic design and instead of a visual design project she wrote "Transcending the Problems of the Black Designer to Success in the Marketplace" as her thesis.  Miller's 1985 thesis studies design, sociology and history to give a portrait of African American job prospects.

She attended the Rhode Island School of Design for her BFA, but when Miller's father died sophomore year, she transferred to Maryland Institute College of Art where she lived closer to her mother. She earned her BFA from MICA.

Miller was awarded a Doctor of Humane Letters from the Vermont College of Fine Arts in February 2021.

In May of 2022, Miller was awarded a Doctor of Fine Arts from Maryland Institute College of Art.

In June of 2022, Miller was awarded a Doctor of Fine Arts from the Rhode Island School of Design.

Career 
After finishing school, Miller worked in broadcast design where she created on-air sets and graphics. During this time she created the logo and identity for BET. After 10 years in broadcasting, she moved to New York City and attended Pratt Institute, and then graduated from Union Theological Seminary.

Writing 
In 1987, Print Magazine published an article on Miller's thesis titled "Black Designers Missing in Action." The thesis and article started a movement to research and promote more diverse designers and for the industry to develop a discourse on the role of diversity in the practice. In 1990, by Step-by-Step magazine published "Embracing Cultural Diversity in Design". In 2013 she wrote a memoir, Black Coral: A Daughter's Apology to her Asian Island Mother. In 2016, the magazine published a follow-up to the 1987 article. The article spurred Stanford University design scholar Michael Grant and the library's special collection director, Regina Roberts, to archive the thesis and catalog of Miller's design work in the Cheryl D. Miller Collection the university. Miller's research found that post-Civil War, the Typographic Union of white printers shut out black and women artisans from the industry to further their own business goals.

Miller's articles are the cornerstone of AIGA's Diversity and Inclusion Taskforce. She is regarded as a trade writer to the graphic design industry. Her influence is seen in the way contemporary graphic designers critically engage with the discipline, on the direction of the field and creators who make up its community, and her thesis is highlighted as crucial text that paved the way for Black designers. Her writing encourages designers and critics to examine the design cannon and discover diverse voices and work who shaped the design industry today. She contends its important due to design's role in social history and by not documenting or understanding all of the industry's practitioners, our society has a weaker understanding of humanity. 

In 2020, Miller began additional work decolonizing the history of graphic design through a curated database titled The History of Black Graphic Design, a curated database constructed with the support of Stanford University librarians

Published on Medium in 2020 as part of Future of Design in Higher Education after watching Miller present at IIT Institute of Design, Eugene Korsunskiy writes about their experience listening to Miller share her views about contemporary graphic design elements that symbolize racism and oppression."I would like to retire the Paul Rand look. I would like to retire mid-century Helvetica. I want to retire flush left. I want to retire rag right. I want to retire white space. I want to retire the Swiss grid… It is the look of my oppressor… a mid-century era when it wasn’t easy to enter the NY marketplace as a Black designer. When I see that look, the only thing it says to me is, "You cannot enter. You don't belong. You're not good enough."

Design 
In 1984, Miller moved to New York City with her husband, and until 2000, ran her own design studio, Cheryl D. Miller Design Inc. Some of the clients included BET, Chase, Time Inc., and American Express. Her personal work was acquired by Stanford University Libraries. She is further collected at The Poster House, New York, and The Design Museum, The Hague. In 1992, Miller was commissioned by NASA to create the poster for Dr. Mae Jeminson. America's first African American woman astronaut.

Available on YouTube, Miller reflects on your long career as a designer. She showcases pieces from her portfolio that are now part of Stanford University's Special Collections and Archives.

On April 3, 2021, Miller was an expert guest on the Design Dedux podcast, where she spoke about gender and race equality in graphic design.

Christian ministry 
Miller is a Master of Divinity graduate from the Union Theological Seminary in New York City. She was ordained in the United Church of Christ and the American Baptist Churches USA and is a professional Christian minister.

Awards and residencies 

In 2021, Miller was awarded an AIGA Award, one of the highest distinctions in the design field, to designers whose influence, careers, and bodies of work represent exemplary and unique stories of dedication to craft, career growth, and the tightly woven fabric of design, technology, culture, and society. "Miller is recognized for her outsized influence within the profession to end the marginalization of BIPOC designers through her civil rights activism, industry exposé writing, research rigor, and archival vision.". Additionally, the same year, Miller was awarded Cooper Hewitt's "Design Visionary" award. 

During the 2020 academic year, Miller became the Distinguished Senior Lecturer for Design and Designer in Residence at the University of Texas at Austin. She is also a faculty member at Howard University and Lesley University College of Art and Design where she teaches graphic design.

In 2021, Cheryl became Maryland Institute College of Art William O. Steinzmetz Designer In Residence Scholar. As part of this residency, Miller participated in “Voices: Black Graphic Design History,” where she held conversations with three other Steinmetz D webinar lectures. In 2021, IBM announced that Miller would be the inaugural IBM Design Scholar as part of its Honorary IBM Design Scholar residency program.

Miller was awarded a Doctor of Humane Letters from the Vermont College of Fine Arts, February 2021. In May of 2022, Miller was awarded a Doctor of Fine Arts from Maryland Institute College of Art. In June of 2022, Miller was awarded a Doctor of Fine Arts from the Rhode Island School of Design.

In October 2022, Miller was a The One Club Hall of Fame Inductee 2022.

Commencement Speeches 
In May of 2022, Miller gave a commencement address to graduating students at the Maryland Institute College of Arts. In June of 2022, Miller gave a commencement address to undergraduate and graduate students at the Rhode Island School of Design.

Bibliography 
 
 Black Coral: A Daughter’s Apology to her Asian Island Mother, Aage Heritage Press, 2013. 

Cheryl D Miller (December 2020). "From 'Black Designers: Missing in Action' to 'Forward in Action': 3 Essential Industry Articles". PRINT. Retrieved 2021-01-06.
Cheryl D Miller "Black Artist in Graphic Communication"

List of work and collaborative experiences 

 William O. Steinzmetz Designer In Residence Scholar at Maryland College Institute of Art, April 2021 – Present
 Part-time Adjunct Professor at Howard University, February 2021 – Present
Part-time Distinguished Senior Lecturer at the University of Texas (Austin, TX), January 2021 – Present
Part-time Distinguished Lectured at Roger William University, January 2021 – Present
 Part-time Adjunct Professor at Lesley University, January 2021 – Present
 President Consultant, Cheryl D. Miller Design/ Cheryl D. Miller Fine Art, 2019–Present
 Design Diversity Futurist, Design Diversity Group, June 2018 – Present
 Contributing Archivist; Collected Artist, The Cheryl D. Miller Collection at Stanford University, March 2018 – Present
 Part-time Professor of DEI, in Communication Design at ArtCenter September 2022-Present

Collections  and exhibitions 

 Maryland Institute College of Art Steinmetz Designer in Residence Exhibition, 2021
The Cheryl D. Miller Collection at Stanford University
 MvVo Art AD Show, New York
 The Poster House Museum, New York
 The Design Museum Deldel
 The Cheryl D. Miller Collection of Black Graphic Design History at The Herb Lubalin Study Center of Design and Typography
 Mosley Gallery 
 University of Maryland Eastern Shore

References

External links 
 
 Miller, Cheryl D. Cheryl D. Miller Personal Archive. , n.d.. Archival material. Stanford University



1952 births
Maryland Institute College of Art alumni
Pratt Institute alumni
American graphic designers
Union Theological Seminary (New York City) alumni
American women graphic designers
Living people
Decolonial artists
American women writers
American women educators
African-American graphic designers
21st-century African-American people
20th-century African-American people
20th-century African-American women
21st-century African-American women